Eneti may refer to:

Ancient peoples
Adriatic Eneti, who lived in northeastern Italy
Illyrian Eneti, who lived inland of Illyria bordering Macedonia
Paphlagonian Eneti, who lived in Paphlagonia

Other uses
 Eneti (company), wind farm construction and services